The 2001 NCAA Division I baseball tournament was played at the end of the 2001 NCAA Division I baseball season to determine the national champion of college baseball.  The tournament concluded with eight teams competing in the College World Series, a double-elimination tournament in its fifty fifth year.  Sixteen regional competitions were held to determine the participants in the final event, with each winner advancing to a best of three series against another regional champion for the right to play in the College World Series.  Each region was composed of four teams, resulting in 64 teams participating in the tournament at the conclusion of their regular season, and in some cases, after a conference tournament.  The fifty-fifth tournament's champion was Miami (FL), coached by Jim Morris.  The Most Outstanding Player was Charlton Jimerson of Miami (FL).

National seeds
Bold indicates CWS participant.
Cal State Fullerton
Miami (FL)
Southern California
Stanford
Tulane
Georgia
East Carolina
Nebraska

Regionals and super regionals
Bold indicates winner. * indicates extra innings. Italics indicates host.

Fullerton Super Regional

Lincoln Super Regional

Metairie Super Regional

Palo Alto Super Regional

Coral Gables Super Regional

Kinston Super Regional

Athens Super Regional

Los Angeles Super Regional

College World Series

Participants

Results

Bracket

Game results

All-Tournament Team

The following players were members of the College World Series All-Tournament Team.

Notable players
 Cal State Fullerton: Chad Cordero, Kirk Saarloos
 Georgia: Jeff Keppinger, Charlie Ford
 Miami (FL): Charlton Jimerson
 Nebraska: 
 Southern California: Mark Prior
 Stanford: Ryan Garko, Sam Fuld
 Tennessee:  Chris Burke 
 Tulane:   Andy Cannizaro

References

NCAA Division I Baseball Championship
NCAA Division I Baseball Championship
NCAA Division I baseball tournament
Baseball in Houston